Veddriq Leonardo (born 11 March 1997) is an Indonesian speed climber. For about a year he held the world record in his discipline, which he set en route to winning the men's speed climbing event at the 2021 IFSC Climbing World Cup in Salt Lake City.

He was first introduced to sport climbing in his first year of high school. In 2014, he participated in his first national championship in Tanjung Balai Karimun, Riau Islands where he was in top eight. In 2016, he won his first medal (bronze) in junior national championship in Bangka Belitung. His first international event was 2018 Moscow World Cup where he placed third.

Achievements

World Games 
Men's speed

Asian Games 
Men's speed relay

Asian Championships 
Men's speed

Men's speed relay

IFSC Climbing World Cup 
The IFSC Climbing World Cup is a series of climbing competitions held annually and organized by the International Federation of Sport Climbing (IFSC). The athletes compete in three disciplines: lead, bouldering and speed. The number of competitions and venues vary from year to year. The first World Cup was held in 1989, and included only lead climbing events. Speed climbing was introduced in 1998 and bouldering in 1999.

Men's speed

World records

Rankings

Climbing World Cup

Number of medals in the Climbing World Cup

Speed

References

External links 

1997 births
Living people
People from Pontianak
Sportspeople from West Kalimantan
Indonesian rock climbers
Sports world record holders
Sport climbers at the 2018 Asian Games
Asian Games gold medalists for Indonesia
Asian Games medalists in sport climbing
Medalists at the 2018 Asian Games
21st-century Indonesian athletes
World Games gold medalists
Competitors at the 2022 World Games
IFSC Climbing World Cup overall medalists
Speed climbers